The Ministry of Environment, Housing and Territorial Development was a national executive ministry of the Government of Colombia charged with determining and regulating the standards and guidelines for the protection of the environment, the improvement and availability of potable water, and the overseeing of housing, territorial development, and sanitation.

Ministers

References

 
Colombia, Environment and Sustainable Development
Colombia, Environment and Sustainable Development
Defunct government agencies of Colombia
Ministry of Environment, Housing and Territorial Development
2002 establishments in Colombia